The Chi-Lites are an American R&B/soul vocal quartet from Chicago, Illinois, United States. Forming at Chicago's Hyde Park High School in 1959, The group's original lineup consisted of singers Robert Lester, Eugene Record, Creadel Jones, Clarence Johnson, Burt Bowen, Eddie Reed and Marshall Thompson.

The Chi-Lites' greatest fame came during the late 1960s through the early 1970s (with members Record, Jones, Lester and Thompson), scoring eleven Top Ten R&B hits from 1969 until 1974. The group also charted 21 songs in the Billboard Hot 100 Pop Chart, and had chart hits in Australia, the United Kingdom, Ireland, and Canada, as well as in the U.S.

History

Forming and early career
The original members were lead singer Eugene Record, Robert "Squirrel" Lester, Clarence Johnson, Burt Bowen, and Eddie Reed of the Chanteurs. The group was formed at Hyde Park Academy High School where majority of the members attended (Record attended Englewood High School and Thompson would later transfer to DuSable High School in his senior year and study music under Walter Dyett ) in Chicago in 1959. The group performed at their High School "Senior Varieties" talent show. Soon after, they released a single entitled, "You've Got a Great Love" written by Johnson. Bowen left the group and was replaced by Sollie McElroy of the Flamingos, who was soon replaced by Marshall Thompson of the Desideros. In 1960, Reed died and Thompson brought in Creadel "Red" Jones who was a member of the Desideros to replace him. In early 1964 the group changed their name to the Hi-Lites and released a song entitled, "I'm So Jealous" with Record on lead.

Noting that the name Hi-lites was already in use and wanting to honor their home town they changed their name to Marshall & the Chi-Lites in 1964. Under their new name they recorded four songs entitled, "Pretty Girl" written by Record, who also was on lead, "Love Bandit" written by Jones with Thompson on lead, "Price of Love" and "Baby It's Time". Clarence Johnson left he group later that year, and their name was subsequently shortened to the Chi-Lites. Eugene Record was the musical group's sole songwriter and lead singer. Record never collaborated with members outside his singing group. In 1968, the group meet with record producer Carl Davis and signed a contract with Brunswick Records out of Chicago. The Chi-Lites with members Record, Thompson, Lester and Jones recorded their first charting song, "Give It Away" written by Davis and Record. The single became a top ten Billboard R&B hit spending nine weeks on the chart and peaking at No. 10 on March 15, 1969.

1971–1979
Their major hits came in 1971 and 1972, "Have You Seen Her" and "Oh Girl", the latter becoming a #1 single on the Billboard Hot 100 on May 27, 1972. Each sold over one million copies and was awarded a gold disc by the RIAA. Other transatlantic chart hits followed, although their output became more fragmented as the group's personnel came and went. Bass singer Jones left in 1973, and was replaced in quick succession by Stanley Anderson, Willie Kinsey, and then Doc Roberson. Shortly thereafter, Eugene Record left, and David Scott and Danny Johnson entered. More personnel changes ensued, when Johnson was replaced by Vandy Hampton in 1977. The Chi-lites cut some tracks for the Inphasion label in 1979, which appeared on an obscure album for the Excello label.

1980–1999
In 1980, Thompson, Jones, and Lester re-formed the group. Lester was the lead singer. The new group continued using the Chi-Lites established name. Creadel Jones left for a second time in 1982, and the group would remain a trio. In 1983, the group released the critically acclaimed Bottoms Up album and achieved notable club and R&B chart success with the title track and "Changing For You." Released on LARC Records, the album was also released in the UK on the R&B label under the distribution wing of PRT. "Changing For You" album version was released in the UK as a 12" single which became popular in London clubs including Flicks in Dartford and The Goldmine in Canvey Island. "Changing For You" also remained on the Caister Weekender playlist for two years. "Changing for You" and the title track "Bottoms Up" were heavily played and promoted by UK Jazz Funk Soul DJ Robbie Vincent. An edited version of "Changing for You" entered the UK Charts and reached No. 61. Record left again in 1988, and new lead Frank Reed joined to replace him. Singer Anthony Reynard Watson replaced Reed later that year and the duty of lead vocals would alternate between Reed and Watson over the course of the next decade. (Lester took over singing lead on "Oh Girl", while Watson led on their other songs).

In 1997, while returning home from a concert in Pennsylvania, the Chi-Lites were involved in a serious car crash which resulted in both Reed and Thompson's wife Constance being ejected from the vehicle. Constance died from her injuries and Reed had to have a metal plate inserted in his back. "Hold On to Your Dreams" was included on the Help Wanted (Heroes are in Short Supply) album in Constance's honor. Reed was subsequently replaced once again by Watson until Watson's permanent departure in 2002. On December 13, 1999, BMI named The Chi-Lites, "Oh Girl" No. 36 of the top 100 songs of the century (1900-1999).

1999–present
In 2003, the Chi-Lites 1970 hit "Are You My Woman? (Tell Me So)" was sampled by Beyonce in her song "Crazy in Love," and their 1974 song "That's How Long" was used as the backdrop for one of the tracks on Jay-Z's Black Album. In March 2004, the group reunited with former lead Eugene Record for a PBS Soul Music special. Record died in July 2005 following a long battle with cancer. Marshall Thompson and Squirrel Lester, along with more recent addition Frank Reed and the group's first female member, wife Tara Thompson, continued as the Chi-Lites, recording and touring over the last two decades with other soul groups such as the Stylistics and Ray, Goodman & Brown. In 2005 the group released the single "Mother Love". Lester died in January 2010, leaving Thompson the sole remaining founding member of the group. Lester was replaced by Fred Simon (formerly of the Lost Generation). In February 2014, Reed died after an illness.

As of 2020, Thompson is continuing the Chi-Lites' legacy as the last surviving member. On June 17, 2020, Hollywood Walk of Fame announced their Class of 2021 to receive stars on Hollywood Boulevard, and the Chi-Lites were named as one of the honorees.

Honors

The group was inducted into the Rhythm and Blues Foundation in 2000 and Record appeared with the group on stage to perform and accept the award. The group was inducted into the Vocal Group Hall of Fame in 2005, and were honored with an induction into the R&B Music Hall of Fame on August 17, 2013, at the Waetejen Auditorium in Cleveland. On September 30, 2021, the Chi-Lites received the 2,702 star on the Hollywood Walk of Fame by Hollywood Chamber of Commerce and the City of Los Angeles. The Award presenters were Sirius XM radio personality Jeff Foxx from New York and Jimmy Walker best known for his role as J.J. On Good Times. Joining Marshall Thompson was the current group of wife Tara Thompson, Fred Simon, Warren Tipton and Mack Miller. Former original Chi-Lites, now deceased, Eugene Record, Robert Squirrel Lester, and Creadel Red Jones will also be remembered.

Personnel
Current members
Marshall Thompson – 1959–present (born August 24, 1942, Chicago)

Current sidemen 
Tara Thompson – 1998–present (born June 29, 1971, Chicago)
Fred Simon – 2010–present (born May 29, 1951, Chicago)
Mack Miller – 2014–present (born May 1, 1955, Chicago)
Warren Tipton – 2018–present (born June 12, 1958, Gary, Indiana)

Former members
Robert "Squirrel" Lester – 1959–2010 (born August 16, 1942, McComb, Mississippi; died January 21, 2010, Chicago)
Eugene Record – 1959–1973, 1980–1988 (born December 23, 1940, Chicago; died July 22, 2005, Chicago)
Creadel "Red" Jones – 1959–1973, 1980–1982 (born September 26, 1940, St. Louis, Missouri; died August 25, 1994 Glendale, California)
Clarence Johnson – 1959–1964

Sidemen only
Stanley Anderson – 1973
Willie Kinsey – 1973
David "Doc" Roberson – 1973
David Scott – 1976–1980
Danny Johnson – 1976–1977
Vandy Hampton – 1976–1980
Frank Reed – 1988, 1990–1993, 1996–1998, 2001–2014 (born September 16, 1954, Omaha, Nebraska; died February 26, 2014)
Anthony Reynard Watson – 1988–1990, 1993–1996, 1998–2002 (born Mobile, Alabama)
Marzette Griffin- 2015–2018 Chicago, IL

Discography

Filmography
 1996 – Original Gangstas, as themselves
 2002 – Only The Strong Survive, as themselves

Television appearances
Soul Train
December 18, 1971 / Season 1 Episode No. 12
March 18, 1972 / Season 1 Episode No. 25
March 31, 1973 / Season 2 Episode No. 24
October 19, 1974 / Season 4 Episode No. 7
February 28, 1976 / Season 5 Episode No. 28
January 31, 1981 / Season 10 Episode No. 16
April 17, 1982 / Season 11 Episode No. 20

American Bandstand
January 13, 1973 / Season 16 Episode No. 12
April 6, 1974 / Season 17 Episode No. 31
January 18, 1975 / Season 1 Episode No. 12

The Sammy Davis Jr. Show
January 10, 1976 / Season 2 Episode No. 15

Midnight Special
September 21, 1973 / Season 2 Episode No. 2

Saturday Night Live

Eugene Record performed "Have You Seen Her" on April 8, 1978.

Into The Night
October 29, 1990 / Season 1 Episode No. 75

References

External links
https://walkoffame.com/thechilites/

The Chi-Lites interview by Pete Lewis, 'Blues & Soul' June 1990 (republished March 2010)
Chi-Lites st Rolling Stone
Marshall Thompson Tells Tom the History of The Chi-Lites. YouTube interview with Tom Meros, September 9, 2017.

 
African-American musical groups
American funk musical groups
American soul musical groups
Musical groups from Chicago
Vocal quartets
20th-century American guitarists
Revue Records artists
Hyde Park Academy High School alumni
1959 establishments in Illinois